Anthony Legendre (born October 28, 1996)  is an American professional soccer player who plays as a left-back.

Club career

Early career
Legendre was born in Jacksonville and grew up in Miami and Jacksonville, where he played soccer at the local YMCA. At age twelve, he and his family emigrated to Canada, where they settled in Ottawa and Legendre began playing for local club Ottawa Royals.

At age fifteen Legendre joined the Ottawa Fury academy program.

Hamilton Wanderers
Legendre started his career playing with New Zealand ISPS Handa Premiership side Hamilton Wanderers.

South Hobart
In July 2018, Legendre signed with NPL Tasmania side South Hobart and made six appearances that season.

Tulsa Roughnecks
On February 21, 2019 Legendre signed with USL Championship club Tulsa Roughnecks. He made his debut on March 17 of that year and made nine league appearances in total that season.

South Bend Lions FC
In March 2021, Legendre signed a contract to play for South Bend Lions Football Club of USL League Two. He made eleven appearances with the team during the 2021 season and earned an assist during a 3–0 win against Toledo Villa FC on June 19.

Stumptown AC
On August 3, Stumptown AC of the National Independent Soccer Association announced it had signed Legendre ahead of the Fall 2021 season.

Personal life
Legendre operates a YouTube Channel in which he describes his training and gives an inside look at the life of a professional/semiprofessional footballer.

References

External links

1996 births
Living people
Association football fullbacks
American soccer players
Soccer players from Jacksonville, Florida
Soccer players from Miami
American people of Haitian descent
American emigrants to Canada
American expatriate soccer players
Expatriate association footballers in New Zealand
American expatriate sportspeople in New Zealand
Expatriate soccer players in Australia
American expatriate sportspeople in Australia
Ottawa Fury FC players
Algonquin College alumni
Hamilton Wanderers players
South Hobart FC players
FC Tulsa players
Stumptown AC players
New Zealand Football Championship players
National Premier Leagues players
USL Championship players
USL League Two players
National Independent Soccer Association players